This list is for lists of places of worship in Wealden in the United Kingdom. There are more than 170 current and former places of worship in Wealden, the largest of six local government districts in the English county of East Sussex. Several former places of worship have been demolished.

Lists 
List of current places of worship in Wealden
 List of demolished places of worship in East Sussex
 List of former places of worship in Wealden

See also 
 List of churches in England